Robert Guy Talamini (January 8, 1939 – May 30, 2022) was an American football player. Talamini, a 6'1", 250 lb lineman, earned third-team All-SEC honors at the University of Kentucky and was drafted by the Houston Oilers of the American Football League (AFL). His professional career began with the AFL's first training camp in 1960, and was capped the day the New York Jets stunned the NFL's  Baltimore Colts in Super Bowl III on January 12, 1969.

Hall of Famers George Blanda and Billy Cannon benefited from his blocking as the Oilers won the first two AFL Championships.   Talamini made first-team All-AFL in 1962 and was a regular at American Football League All-Star games, selected to six straight, through 1967.  He anchored an offensive line that gave Blanda time to set passing records that would last for decades and opened holes for the likes of Cannon, Charlie Tolar, Sid Blanks and Hoyle Granger to run through.  Talamini, Don Floyd and Jim Norton were the last of the original Oilers.

After two AFL crowns and three Eastern Division titles, Talamini watched the club rebuild and win the division again in 1967.  The Oilers fell one game short in 1967, but Talamini got to realize his dream the following year when he was released and picked up by the New York Jets. Opening holes for Matt Snell and blocking defenders away from Joe Namath.  Talamini was selected to the All-Time All-AFL second-team.

In 2011, he was inducted in the Kentucky Pro Football Hall of Fame.

Talamini died on May 30, 2022, at the age of 83.

References

See also
Other American Football League players

1939 births
2022 deaths
American football offensive linemen
American people of Italian descent
Kentucky Wildcats football players
Houston Oilers players
New York Jets players
American Football League All-Star players
American Football League players
Players of American football from Louisville, Kentucky